Saros cycle series 118 for solar eclipses occurs at the Moon's descending node, repeating every 18 years, 11 days, containing 72 events. All eclipses in this series occurs at the Moon's descending node.

This solar saros is linked to Lunar Saros 111.

Saros 118 

It is a part of Saros cycle 118, repeating every 18 years, 11 days, containing 72 events. The series started with partial solar eclipse on May 24, 803 AD. It contains total eclipses from August 19, 947 AD through October 25, 1650, hybrid eclipses on November 4, 1668 and November 15, 1686, and annular eclipses from November 27, 1704 through April 30, 1957. The series ends at member 72 as a partial eclipse on July 15, 2083. The longest duration of totality was 6 minutes, 59 seconds on May 16, 1398.

Umbral eclipses
Umbral eclipses (annular, total and hybrid) can be further classified as either: 1) Central (two limits), 2) Central (one limit) or 3) Non-Central (one limit). The statistical distribution of these classes in Saros series 118 appears in the following table.

Events

References 
 http://eclipse.gsfc.nasa.gov/SEsaros/SEsaros118.html

External links
Saros cycle 118 - Information and visualization

Solar saros series